This is a list of areas in Bengaluru Cantonment, a military cantonment used during the British Raj in the 19th and early 20th century.

See also
 List of areas in Bengaluru Pete

References

History of Bangalore
Bangalore Civil and Military Station
Cantonments of British India